Damjan Blečić (born 20 March 1980 in Belgrade) is a Serbian handballer who plays for RK Crvena zvezda in the Serbian Superleague.

International honours
EHF Cup: 
Finalist: 2006

References

1980 births
Serbian male handball players
Living people
Handball players from Belgrade
Serbian expatriate sportspeople in France
Serbian expatriate sportspeople in Germany
Serbian expatriate sportspeople in Spain
Serbian expatriate sportspeople in Denmark
Serbian expatriate sportspeople in North Macedonia
Serbian expatriate sportspeople in Qatar
Serbian expatriate sportspeople in the United Arab Emirates
Serbian expatriate sportspeople in Romania
Expatriate handball players